In Greek mythology, Dardanus (Ancient Greek: Δάρδανος, Dardanos) was the founder of the city of Dardanus at the foot of Mount Ida in the Troad.

Family 
Dardanus was a son of Zeus and the Pleiad Electra, daughter of Atlas but one author claims that his real father was the Corythus, an Italian king. He was the brother of Iasion and sometimes of Harmonia and Emathion.

Mythology 
Dionysius of Halicarnassus (1.61–62) states that Dardanus' original home was in Arcadia, where Dardanus and his elder brother Iasus (elsewhere more commonly called Iasion) reigned as kings following Atlas. Dardanus married Chryse, daughter of Pallas, by whom he fathered two sons: Idaeus and Deimas. When a great flood occurred, the survivors, who were living on mountains that had now become islands, split into two groups: one group remained and took Deimas as king while the other sailed away, eventually settling in the island of Samothrace. There Iasus (Iasion) was slain by Zeus for lying with Demeter. Dardanus and his people found the land poor and so most of them set sail for Asia Minor.

A different account in Virgil's Aeneid (3.163f) has Aeneas in a dream learn from his ancestral Penates that "Dardanus and Father Iasius" and the Penates themselves originally came from Hesperia, afterwards renamed as Italy.  This tradition holds that Dardanus was a Tyrrhenian prince, and that his mother Electra was married to Corythus, king of Tarquinia.

Other accounts make no mention of Arcadia or Hesperia, though they sometimes mention a flood and speak of Dardanus sailing on a hide-raft (as part of the flood story?) from Samothrace to the Troad near Abydos. All accounts agree that Dardanus came to the Troad from Samothrace and was there welcomed by King Teucer. Dardanus married Batea the daughter of Teucer. (Dionysius mentions that Dardanus' first wife Chryse had died.) Dardanus received land on Mount Ida from his father-in-law. There Dardanus founded the city of Dardanus which became the capital of his kingdom. He later founded the city of Thymbra in honor of his friend Thymbraeus, who is said to have been killed by Dardanus. Dardanus waged war successfully against his neighbors, especially distinguishing himself against the Paphlagonians and thereby extending the boundaries of his kingdom with considerable acquisitions.

Dardanus' children by Batea were Ilus, Erichthonius, Idaea and Zacynthus. Ilus died before his father.  According to Dionysius of Halicarnassus, Zacynthus was the first settler on the island afterwards called Zacynthus. Dardanus' sons by Chryse, his first wife, were Idaeus and Dimas. Dionysius says (1.61.4) that Dimas and Idaeus founded colonies in Asia Minor. Idaeus gave his name to the Idaean mountains, that is Mount Ida, where he built a temple to the Mother of the Gods (Cybele) and instituted mysteries and ceremonies still observed in Phrygia in Dionysius's time. According to Dictys Cretensis, his wife was called Olizone, daughter of Phineus and became the mother of Erichthonius. In other accounts, the wife of Dardanus was called Arisbe, daughter of King Teucer of Crete or King Macareus of Lesbos.

Dardanus reigned for 64 or 65 years and was succeeded by his son Erichthonius or in some accounts, Ilus.

Cultural depictions 
There are operas on the subject of Dardanus by Jean-Philippe Rameau (1739), Carl Stamitz (1770) and Antonio Sacchini (1784).

Family tree

Notes

References 

 Dictys Cretensis, from The Trojan War. The Chronicles of Dictys of Crete and Dares the Phrygian translated by Richard McIlwaine Frazer Jr. (1931-). Indiana University Press. 1966. Online version at the Topos Text Project.
 Dionysus of Halicarnassus, Roman Antiquities. English translation by Earnest Cary in the Loeb Classical Library, 7 volumes. Harvard University Press, 1937–1950. Online version at Bill Thayer's Web Site
 Dionysius of Halicarnassus, Antiquitatum Romanarum quae supersunt, Vol I-IV. . Karl Jacoby. In Aedibus B.G. Teubneri. Leipzig. 1885. Greek text available at the Perseus Digital Library.
 Lactantius, Divine Institutes, Translated by William Fletcher (1810–1900). From Ante-Nicene Fathers, Vol. 7. Edited by Alexander Roberts, James Donaldson, and A. Cleveland Coxe. (Buffalo, NY: Christian Literature Publishing Co., 1886.) Online version at the Topos Text Project.
Maurus Servius Honoratus, In Vergilii carmina comentarii. Servii Grammatici qui feruntur in Vergilii carmina commentarii; recensuerunt Georgius Thilo et Hermannus Hagen. Georgius Thilo. Leipzig. B. G. Teubner. 1881. Online version at the Perseus Digital Library.
Pausanias, Description of Greece with an English Translation by W.H.S. Jones, Litt.D., and H.A. Ormerod, M.A., in 4 Volumes. Cambridge, MA, Harvard University Press; London, William Heinemann Ltd. 1918. . Online version at the Perseus Digital Library
Pausanias, Graeciae Descriptio. 3 vols. Leipzig, Teubner. 1903.  Greek text available at the Perseus Digital Library.
Stephanus of Byzantium, Stephani Byzantii Ethnicorum quae supersunt, edited by August Meineike (1790-1870), published 1849. A few entries from this important ancient handbook of place names have been translated by Brady Kiesling. Online version at the Topos Text Project.

Mythological kings of Troy
Kings in Greek mythology
Trojans
Children of Zeus
Characters in Book VI of the Aeneid
Characters in the Aeneid
Arcadian characters in Greek mythology
Mythological city founders
Arcadian mythology
Flood myths
Etruscan kings